Charles MacDonald may refer to:
 Charles Macdonald (professor) (1828–1901), Scottish-Canadian mathematician and educator
 Charles James MacDonald (1831–1903), lawyer and political figure in Nova Scotia, Canada
 Charles B. Macdonald (1855–1939), American golfer
 Charles H. MacDonald (1914–2002), U.S. flying ace of World War II
 Charles B. MacDonald (1922–1990), military historian
 Charlie MacDonald (born 1981), English footballer
 C. Leslie Macdonald (1856–1929), Australian racehorse owner and breeder
 Charles Macdonald, Nova Scotia artist and architect who built the Charles Macdonald Concrete House Museum

See also
 Charles McDonald (disambiguation)